Case Unclosed was an informative news and public affairs television show in the Philippines aired every Thursday evenings by GMA Network. The show was hosted by Arnold Clavio, who previously hosted Emergency. Kara David served as the first host until March 5, 2009, when she was replaced by Clavio to host OFW Diaries.

The episodes of this programs featured different cases that are currently unsolved. The dramatization was directed by different Filipino film directors.

List of episodes

Kara David

Arnold Clavio

Lists of Philippine television series episodes
Lists of documentary television series episodes